Kŏmbullang station is a railway station in Sep'o county, Kangwŏn province, North Korea, on the Kangwŏn Line of the Korean State Railway.

The station, along with the rest of the former Kyŏngwŏn Line, was opened by the Chosen Government Railway on 16 August 1914.

References

Railway stations in North Korea